Ewald Demeyere (born 1974) is a Belgian harpsichordist, conductor and music theorist. He is known as an expert in partimento realization and counterpoint.

Education
Ewald Demeyere received his Master's degree in harpsichord at the University College Antwerp. Immediately after his studies, he became a teacher of harmony, counterpoint and fugue. In 2002, he succeeded Jos van Immerseel as senior lecturer in historical harpsichord. In 2009, Demeyere obtained the degree of Doctor in the Arts at the University of Antwerp and Artesis Hogeschool Antwerpen with the thesis A Contextual, Text-Critical Analysis of Johann Sebastian Bach's Art of Fugue – Reflections on Performance Practice and Text-Critical Analysis, and the interaction between them. In 2013, his book Johann Sebastian Bach's Art of Fugue – Performance Practice based on German Eighteenth-Century Theory was published by Leuven University Press.

Teaching
 Partimento, improvisation, oratorio and historical performance practice at the University College Antwerp.
 Harpsichord, partimento and improvisation at the Institut Supérieur de Musique et de Pédagogie of Namur, where he also heads the Early Music department.

Discography

Awards
 C.P.E. Bach The Complete Works Counterpoint Contest (2018) – Winner

Books

Articles

See also
 Music conservatories of Naples
 Robert Gjerdingen

References

External links
 
 AP University College Antwerp Faculty Page.
 IMEP Institut Supérieur de Musique et de Pédagogie.

1974 births
Place of birth missing (living people)
Living people
Belgian harpsichordists
Belgian conductors (music)
Belgian male musicians
Male conductors (music)